Stoke Brook is a small brook in South Gloucestershire, England. It gives its name to the settlements of Stoke Gifford, Harry Stoke, Little Stoke, Great Stoke, Stoke Lodge and Bradley Stoke. 
The area around the brook was built up greatly during the 20th Century, as the villages of Stoke Gifford and the surrounding area met the northern edge of Bristol. Hence the number of villages and estates bearing the name.

South Gloucestershire District
Rivers of Gloucestershire